Vangani is a railway station on the Central line of the Mumbai Suburban Railway network.

On local time of 17:03, April 17, 2021, a visually impaired mother took a 6-years old child, who had goes off edge of platform and fallen on the tracks when an express train approaching, a railway worker named Mayur Shelkhe rush to save the child from tracks only a 2-3 seconds before a train passing and station staff flagging to order the train to stop, both railway worker and the child are safely climbed to the platform while risking their life, and the train stops for a while, recorded by many CCTV cameras, the Ministry of Railway in India has praised Mayur Shelkhe's good Samaritan and awarded with Rs 50,000 in cash

Gallery

References 

Railway stations in Thane district
Mumbai Suburban Railway stations
Mumbai CR railway division
Kalyan-Lonavala rail line